Band of Gold: The Best of Freda Payne is a 24-track collection of songs that were recorded by Freda Payne for Invictus Records (which was owned by the songwriting team of Holland-Dozier-Holland, who happened to be friends of hers). Originally from the United Kingdom, it was released in the United States as an import. This collection features ten songs from her album Band of Gold, seven from Contact, all four from The Best of Freda Payne, and only three from Reaching Out. Many of the songs were written by Holland, Dozier and Holland themselves, often using the pseudonym Edithe Wayne for copyright reasons. Inside the album cover is a biographical essay about Payne's life and career which concentrates mostly on her career with the Invictus label (she was an actress and a jazz singer as well) and was written in August 2000 by Geoff Brown of Mojo.

Track listing

2000 compilation albums
Freda Payne albums